Kiidjärve   is a village in Põlva Parish, Põlva County in southeastern Estonia. The village territory includes Saesaare Reservoir with hydroelectric power station and Valgesoo bog (Landscape protection area).

As of 2011 Census, the settlement's population was 168.

In Kiidjärve, there's a railway halt on Elron's Tartu–Koidula line, but is served by only one train a day. The journey from/to Tartu takes about 45 minutes.

Kiidjärve is home to "Maarja Village" (Maarja Küla), home of young adults with learning disabilities.

Kiidjärve Manor
Kiidjärve was the location of Kiidjärve Manor, first mentioned in the end of the 17th century. At first it belonged to the Zoege von Manteuffel family, but changed the owner very often thereinafter. The last baron E. von Maydell built a red brick watermill on the Ahja River in 1914. In 1922 the manor was dispossessed and gifted to Independence War veteran Victor Mutt. The manor's classicist wooden main building was destroyed during a fire in 1950. In 2003 a new culture house-library was built on the site. The surrounding park was created in the second half of the 18th century, and was taken under natural protection in 1972.

Notable people
Actress Ene Järvis (born 1947) was born in Kiidjärve.
Singer and television journalist Kalmer Tennosaar (1928–2004) was born in Kiidjärve.

Gallery

References

External links
Kiidjärve–Kooraste Recreation Area by State Forest Management Centre
Kiidjärve-Taevaskoja-Kiidjärve hiking trail by Matkajuht
Kiidjärve pismire trail by Matkajuht
Valgesoo nature trail by Matkajuht
Kiidjärve Manor park 
Maarja Village

Villages in Põlva County